Eucalyptus psammitica, commonly known as bastard white mahogany, is a species of small to medium-sized tree that is endemic to eastern Australia. It has rough, stringy or fibrous, prickly bark on the trunk and branches, lance-shaped to curved adult leaves, flower buds in groups of between seven and eleven, white flowers and cup-shaped to hemispherical fruit.

Description
It has rough, stringy or fibrous, loose, grey or grey-brown bark on the trunk and branches. Flowering occurs from October to November and the flowers are white.

Taxonomy
Eucalyptus psammitica was first formally described by the botanists Lawrence Alexander Sidney Johnson and Kenneth Hill in 1990 in the journal Telopea.

Eucalyptus psammitica is part of the white mahogany group as recognised by Ken Hill. Others in the group include E. acmenoides, E. mediocris, E. carnea, E. apothalassica, E. helidonica, E. latisinensis and E. umbra. The specific epithet is from the Greek word psammos meaning sand in reference to its preferred habitat.

Distribution
Bastard white mahogany occurs in an area stretching from north-west of Coffs Harbour to north-west of Grafton in north-eastern New South Wales. It is also found in the area south-west of Brisbane in Queensland. The tree is found in subcoastal areas of over and around sandstone growing in shallow sandy soils.

References

psammitica
Myrtales of Australia
Flora of New South Wales
Trees of Australia
Flora of Queensland
Plants described in 1990